Ottawa Centre is an urban federal electoral district in Ontario, Canada, that has been represented in the House of Commons of Canada since 1968. While the riding's boundaries (mainly to the south and west as the north and east borders have remained the Ottawa River and Rideau River, respectively) have changed over the years to account for population changes, the riding has always comprised the central areas of Ottawa, the nation's capital.

The House of Commons of Canada meets in the West Block of the Parliament Buildings on Parliament Hill, which is located within this district.

History
The riding was created in 1966 from Carleton, Ottawa West and Ottawa East ridings. It initially consisted of that part of Ottawa north of the Rideau River, west of a line following the Rideau Canal to the Canadian Pacific Railway line (currently about where Nicholas Street is), and generally east of Bayswater Road (now Ave.), and south of that the CPR line where the O-Train currently is.

The 1976 redistribution saw significant changes to the riding. It lost territory around Mechanicsville (north of Wellington Street West, west of the current O-Train) and Old Ottawa East (north of Clegg St), while gaining all of the Civic Hospital and Hintonburg neighbourhoods east of Holland Avenue and south of Wellington, Carleton Heights, Riverside Park and the Hunt Club area west of the current O-Train line.

The 1987 redistribution saw the riding expand westward to Island Park Drive, while losing all of its territory south of the Rideau River. Additionally, the riding gained back all of Old Ottawa East south of The Queensway.

The 1996 redistribution saw the riding expand further westward to Sherbourne Road / Maitland Avenue north of the Queensway, as well as gaining the eastern half of Carlington (east of Merivale Road). Also, the area of Old Ottawa East north of the Queensway was added back to the riding.

The riding did not change its boundaries in 2003.  Following the Canadian federal electoral redistribution, 2012, there was a minor change in the riding's southwestern boundary, which was moved from the former city limits to Baseline Road and Fisher Avenue.

Members of Parliament
The riding was won in the 1984 election by New Democrat Mike Cassidy. The riding was subsequently won by Liberal Mac Harb in the 1988 election who held it until 2003 when he was appointed to the Senate. The riding was left vacant by Prime Minister Paul Martin until the 2004 election when Ed Broadbent, a former leader of the NDP, defeated Liberal Richard Mahoney, a high-profile lawyer and Liberal strategist and long-time ally of former Prime Minister Paul Martin. The other candidates in 2004 were Mike Murphy of the Conservatives, David Chernushenko of the Greens, Louis Lang of the Marxist-Leninists, Michael Foster, Stuart Ryan of the Communists, Robert Gauthier, and Carla Marie Dancey. Paul Dewar, son of former Ottawa mayor, Marion Dewar, held the riding from 2006 until 2015. Notably, Dewar won the riding with 52 percent of ballots cast in the 2011 federal election.

Ottawa Centre is represented in the House of Commons of Canada by Yasir Naqvi from the Liberal Party of Canada.

Geography
The riding covers most of downtown Ottawa, including the Parliament Buildings.  From the Rideau River, the riding stretches west encompassing the neighbourhoods of Downtown, Centretown (Centretown West which includes Little Italy is usually considered a distinct neighbourhood), LeBreton Flats, Civic Hospital, Mechanicsville, Hintonburg, Westboro, eastern part of Carlington, Highland Park, and McKellar Park.  The riding encompasses additional neighbourhoods south of downtown, including The Glebe, Old Ottawa South, Lees Avenue, Old Ottawa East and others.

Many public sector workers live in the riding. The northern part of the riding contains many government office buildings, including Parliament Hill. The riding also includes Carleton University and Saint Paul University's (where many UOttawa students have residence) campuses and residences.

Demographics
According to the Canada 2021 Census

Ethnic groups: 72.4% White, 5.5% Black, 4.5% Chinese, 4.1% South Asian, 3.8% Indigenous, 2.4% Arab, 1.7% Southeast Asian, 1.4% Latin American, 1.0% West Asian
Languages: 67.0% English, 9.1% French, 1.9% Arabic, 1.8% Mandarin, 1.5% Spanish, 1.1% Cantonese, 1.1% Italian
Religions: 42.2% Christian (22.9% Catholic, 4.4% Anglican, 3.4% United Church, 1.8% Christian Orthodox, 1.0% Presbyterian, 8.7% Other), 4.8% Muslim, 2.0% Jewish, 1.4% Hindu, 1.3% Buddhist, 46.9% None 
Median income: $54,800 (2020) 
Average income: $77,800 (2020)

The Ottawa Centre riding has the highest percentage of master's degree holders in all of Canada  (12.7%)

In the 2015 election, the riding had the highest turnout in the country with just over 82% of electors casting a ballot in the election.

Election results

2021 federal election

2019 federal election
Still holding the Cabinet post of Environment Minister, Ms McKenna was challenged by a new NDP candidate, Emilie Taman, along with other challengers Carol Clemenhagen for the Conservative Party, Angela Keller-Herzog for the Green Party, and Merylee Sevilla for the People's Party.  Ms McKenna gained over 4,000 votes from the previous election in 2015, beating her nearest rival by over 15,000 votes.

2015 federal election
Ottawa Centre lost a sliver of territory to Ottawa West—Nepean, as its southwestern border moved from the former Ottawa City limits to Fisher Avenue and Baseline Road. The total population of this area lost (2011 Census) was 424.

Ottawa Centre saw the highest turnout in the entire country in the 2015 election.

2011 federal election

2008 federal election

2006 federal election
Broadbent announced in 2005 that he would not run for re-election so he could devote more time to care for his ailing wife, Lucille. Richard Mahoney was again the Liberal candidate, hoping that, without an opposing star candidate, such as Broadbent, he would be elected this time. The NDP nominated Paul Dewar, a teacher and son of former mayor Marion Dewar. As the Liberal national numbers declined over the course of the campaign, it seemed more likely that the NDP could retain the seat. Mahoney went on the offensive late in the campaign, claiming a vote for Paul Dewar would help the Conservatives. Dewar retained most of Broadbent's voters and won by over 5000 votes. The riding also gave the Green Party of Canada one of its best performances nationwide with over 6,500 votes, over 10%.

2006 nomination contests

2004 federal election

The 2004 election was an unusual campaign in Ottawa Centre. The seat was vacated in September 2003 when Liberal incumbent Mac Harb received his long-awaited patronage appointment to the Senate of Canada from outgoing Prime Minister Jean Chrétien. Paul Martin loyalist Richard Mahoney won the Liberal nomination and expected to win the riding.

Former NDP leader and widely respected statesman Ed Broadbent came out of political retirement to win the NDP nomination in January. As the seat was vacant, a by-election was expected to fill the seat and campaigning began in early 2004. However, Prime Minister Paul Martin delayed calling the by-election, in the expectation that a general election would soon be called.

In May 2004, a federal election was called, pre-empting the by-election.  Broadbent was increasingly favoured to win, a mid-campaign poll showed him ahead. In addition to Broadbent's personal popularity, the NDP under new leader Jack Layton had greatly increased its popularity, especially in urban Ontario. The campaign was still hard-fought.  In the end, Broadbent won a strong victory, and subsequently announced his retirement the following year, in April 2005.

		
2004 nomination contests

Previous elections

Note: Canadian Alliance vote is compared to the Reform vote in 1997 election.

See also
 List of Canadian federal electoral districts
 Past Canadian electoral districts

References

Notes

External links
 Politwitter
 Project Democracy
 Pundit's Guide
 StatsCan District Profile

Sources
Riding history from the Library of Parliament
 2011 results from Elections Canada
 Campaign expense data from Elections Canada

Electoral district associations
Liberal Party
Green Party
NDP

Federal electoral districts of Ottawa
Ontario federal electoral districts
1966 establishments in Ontario